Bumping Mics with Jeff Ross & Dave Attell is a Netflix comedy television show featuring comedians Jeff Ross and Dave Attell.

The series was directed by Andrew Jarecki.

Overview
Bumping Mics follows three days with Jeff Ross and Dave Attell as their touring stand-up comedy show Bumping Mics comes to an end and features the two improvising on stage with various guests at the Comedy Cellar in Manhattan.

Critical reception
Forbes wrote "What makes the series so spectacular is not just its hilarity, formatting or celebrity guests. It’s its ability to portray a softer side to two of stand-up’s most notoriously hard-edged personalities. Ross and Attell have built careers on being the neighborhood jerks. But, they transcend into something far deeper in this new series." Sophie Wiener, of The Daily Free Press, said the show was "crude and mean, but heartwarming".

References

External links
Bumping Mics with Jeff Ross & Dave Attell on Netflix

2018 American television series debuts
2018 American television series endings
2010s American comedy television series
English-language Netflix original programming